The 2013–14 División de Honor is the 47th season of the top flight of the Spanish domestic rugby union competition since its inception in 1953. Regular season began on 14 September 2013 and finished on 4 May 2014.

The playoff semifinals were played on 18/19 May with the Final taking place on 1 June.

Valladolid successfully defended its 2012–13 season title by defeating city rivals Hermi El Salvador 26–15 in the championship final. Ciencias was the team relegated to División de Honor B 2014–15.

Competition format
The regular season runs through 22 matchdays. Upon completion the regular season, it is the turn of championship playoffs. The breakdown is as follows;
Teams in 1st & 2nd at regular season standings receive a bye to semifinal.
Teams at 3rd, 4th, 5th & 6th position plays for the two vacant places in quarter-finals.
Team in 11th position plays the relegation playoff.
Team in 12th position is relegated.

Each win means 4 points to winning team.
A draw means 2 points for each team.
1 bonus point for a team that achieves 4 tries in a match.
A defeat by 7 or less points means 1 bonus point for defeated team.

Teams

Regular season standings

Source: Federación Española de Rugby

Championship playoffs

Quarter-finals

Semifinals

Final

Relegation playoff
The relegation playoff was contested over two legs by Blusens Universidade Vigo, who finished 11th in División de Honor, and neighbours Sant Cugat, the losing team from División de Honor B promotion playoff final. Vigo won the tie, winning 48-40 on aggregate.

1st leg

2nd leg

Blusens Universidade Vigo won 48–40 on aggregate and remained in División de Honor for 2014–15 season.

Scorers statistics

By try points

By total points

See also
2013–14 División de Honor B de Rugby

References

External links
Official site

2013-14
 
Spain